Ivan Aleksandrovich Stolbovoy (born 11 August 1986) is a Russian former professional football player.

Career

Club career
He made his Russian Football National League debut for FC Dynamo Makhachkala on 26 March 2006 in a game against FC Mashuk-KMV Pyatigorsk.

In 2020, Stolbovoy joined FC Akzhayik in Kazakhstan.

References

External links
 

1986 births
People from Primorsky Krai
Living people
Russian footballers
Russian expatriate footballers
FC Asmaral Moscow players
FC Rotor Volgograd players
FC Luch Vladivostok players
FC Volgar Astrakhan players
Association football forwards
FC Khimik Dzerzhinsk players
FC Inter Cherkessk players
FC Akzhayik players
Russian expatriate sportspeople in Kazakhstan
Expatriate footballers in Kazakhstan
Kazakhstan First Division players
FC Dynamo Makhachkala players
Sportspeople from Primorsky Krai